Kebumen may refer to:

Kebumen (town)
Kebumen Regency